Shaun "Jack" Maloney (1911–1999) was an American labor activist active in the Midwestern United States in the 20s and 30s and the West Coast of the United States after 1942.

Maloney was born on 10 September 1911 in Minneapolis. In his early life he was known as Jack or John Severson after his step father but he began to use his biological father's name around 1936 after receiving federal documents under that name. His mother and step father were politically active with Irish nationalism and the Industrial Workers of the World and he followed in their footsteps. He participated in the Minneapolis general strike of 1934 as well as several others. In 1940 he was jailed when during a strike by the North Central District Drivers Council a delivery van was destroyed.

In 1942 to avoid the draft he joined the United States Merchant Marine. After sailing once to Russia in a convoy that suffered heavily casualties he moved to the west coast and sailed the pacific for many years and was active with the Sailors' Union of the Pacific until he was expelled over internal disagreements in 1949. He joined the International Longshoremen's and Warehousemen's Union in 1953. He was elected president of the local branch in 1970. He retired in 1976.

He died on 19 December 1999.

References 

1911 births
1999 deaths
American trade union leaders
People from Minneapolis